Juan Antonio "Juanan" Entrena Gálvez (born 19 May 1996) is a Spanish footballer who plays as a left winger.

Club career
Born in Huétor-Tájar, Granada, Andalusia, Entrena joined FC Barcelona's La Masia in 2011, after spells at Sevilla FC and Granada CF. In July 2013, he moved to RCD Espanyol, being assigned to the  Juvenil squad.

Entrena was promoted to the reserves ahead of the 2015–16 season, and made his senior debut on 5 September 2015 by starting in a 3–2 Segunda División B home win against FC Barcelona B. He scored his first senior goal the following 3 January, netting the equalizer in a 2–2 draw at Villarreal CF B.

On 11 August 2016 Entrena moved to another reserve team, Granada CF B also in the third level. He made his first team debut on 30 November, coming on as a late substitute for Javi Márquez in a 1–0 home win against CA Osasuna, for the season's Copa del Rey.

Entrena made his La Liga debut on 6 May 2017, replacing fellow youth graduate Aly Mallé in a 0–4 home loss against Real Madrid. On 6 July, he cut ties with the club. On 7 July, he joined Deportivo Alavés as a free agent, being immediately loaned to Croatian First Football League club NK Rudeš for one year.

On 19 June 2018, Entrena signed for Cypriot First Division side AC Omonia.

On 29 January 2021, Entrena signed for HIFK.

References

External links

1996 births
Living people
Sportspeople from the Province of Granada
Spanish footballers
Footballers from Andalusia
Association football wingers
La Liga players
Segunda División B players
Veikkausliiga players
RCD Espanyol B footballers
Club Recreativo Granada players
Granada CF footballers
Deportivo Alavés players
Croatian Football League players
NK Rudeš players
AC Omonia players
UD Melilla footballers
Orihuela CF players
HIFK Fotboll players
Spanish expatriate footballers
Spanish expatriate sportspeople in Croatia
Spanish expatriate sportspeople in Cyprus
Spanish expatriate sportspeople in Finland
Expatriate footballers in Croatia
Expatriate footballers in Cyprus
Expatriate footballers in Finland